is a Japanese mixed martial artist and professional wrestler currently competing in IGF as . A professional MMA competitor since 1996, he was a longtime veteran of PRIDE and Pancrase and has also competed in other mixed martial arts promotions such as K-1 Hero's, Cage Rage, the SFL, Vale Tudo Japan, UFC, DREAM, and DEEP. He is the former DREAM Openweight Grand Prix Champion (Super Hulk). Often undersized and a huge fan favorite in Japan, Minowa earned his nickname "The Giant Killer" by participating in many openweight contests, often submitting much larger opponents. Also renowned for his durability, he is a veteran of 115 fights, and is known for his trademark red speedo and mullet.

Mixed martial arts career

Early career
Minowa made his professional debut in the Lumax Cup in 1996, but would spend most of his early career in the Pancrase promotion. Minowa had a poor start to his MMA career, going 1–8–1 in his first ten fights, taking on MMA pioneers such as Yuki Kondo and Jason DeLucia, and with the win being in his Pancrase debut. The young Minowa would turn his career around, however, improving to 12–11–6 with a win over Daiju Takase before fighting in his first and only fight in the UFC at UFC 25 in Tokyo, Japan. The bout was against Joe Slick and Minowa won via TKO from a cut that Slick received.

Minowa continued to fight in Pancrase as well as another Japanese organization, DEEP, before leaving the Pancraseism team in April 2003.

PRIDE
Minowa made his PRIDE Fighting Championships debut against future UFC Light Heavyweight Champion Quinton "Rampage" Jackson. Around this time, he would briefly join the Brazilian Top Team, becoming its first Japanese member and the only who didn't come from a Brazilian jiu-jitsu background.

Minowa was known in PRIDE for his entertaining entrances and sporting of the Japanese flag as a cape as well as his aggressive, high-risk style of fighting which has seen him employ flying dropkicks amongst other pro-wrestling derived maneuvers. It was also during his career with PRIDE that he continued to cement his legacy in taking on fighters that were much bigger than himself, winning most of the resultant freak show fights and earning the nickname "The Giant Killer".

He participated in PRIDE's first 185 lb tournament where he won over Phil Baroni, but went on to lose in the second round to former UFC Middleweight Champion Murilo Bustamante. On December 31, 2005, Minowa fought the legendary Kazushi Sakuraba, in which he almost landed a kneebar and then a heel hook, but was caught with a Kimura lock and defeated at nine minutes into the first round. Minowa next fought at PRIDE Bushido 10, where he faced the 7-foot-2 Giant Silva. Minowa dominated the fight, using a forward roll to get past Silva's enormous reach and then landing a single leg takedown that put Silva on his back. Minowa promptly landed multiple knees to the head of Silva, causing the referee to stop the fight at 2:23 of the first round. Following that, he fell to Mirko Cro Cop due to strikes in the first round. However, he then rebounded with wins over Park Hyun Kab, Eric "Butterbean" Esch, and American professional wrestler Mike Plotcheck.

Minowa was knocked out in his last fight for PRIDE by Kiyoshi Tamura at PRIDE Shockwave 2006, but celebrated 10 years as a fighter at the CMA Festival 2 event by defeating Min-Seok Heo in the main event after his opponent's corner threw in the towel after the first round. His next opponent was South Korean wrestler Choi Seung Hyun at Heat4: Mega Battle Heat from Nagoya. Minowa won the bout via shoulder lock.

HERO'S
Minowa later competed for K-1's HERO'S promotion. His biggest match there was another of his classical openweight affairs against Zuluzinho, who outweighed Minowa by 102 kg/225Ibs. The Japanese performed well, circling the less mobile Brazilian and at one point throwing him with seoi nage, but Zulu eventually caught and smothered him, finishing him with ground and pound.

DREAM
He fought MMA legend and former mentor Masakatsu Funaki at the DREAM 6 event on September 22, 2008. He was submitted in the first round via heel hook.

At DREAM 8 he lost via decision to professional wrestler Katsuyori Shibata, after being suplexed by the young Japanese fighter, but rebounded at Dream 9 defeating Bob Sapp in what was his 80th fight.

He faced the 7'2" 319 lb Choi Hong-man at DREAM 11 on October 6, 2009. Throughout the fight he attempted to take his opponent down, being successful on two occasions in the first round, before submitting his opponent in the second.

At Dynamite!! 2009 Minowa squared off with Cameroonian fighter Rameau Thierry Sokoudjou in the finals of the DREAM Super Hulk tournament. In the first round Sokoudjou landed many strikes on the smaller fighter while Minowa attempted leglocks. At the end of the second round Minowa had Sokoudjou in a kneebar but was cut off by the bell before he could adjust his grip. In the third round Minowa and Sokodjou both received two yellow cards (10% purse deduction for one) for inactivity 3 minutes into the round, but with 90 seconds left Minowa sprang forward and connected against Sokoudjou's jaw with a left hook, dropping him to the ground for the TKO victory and winning the Super Hulk Tournament.

Minowa went on to fight American Super Heavyweights Jimmy Ambriz and Imani Lee at DREAM 13 and DREAM 14 respectively, winning both fights by submission.

Then for DREAM 16, Minowa was scheduled to fight James Thompson but three days before the event, had his opponent switched to Satoshi Ishii and he lost by unanimous decision.

Independent promotions
Minowa next faced Chang Hee Kim of South Korea at DEEP: 50th Impact on October 24, 2010. Minowa gave up a significant weight advantage to Kim, who weighs over 300 pounds. He won the fight via submission in the first round.

Minowa faced Kendall Grove at ProElite 3 on January 21, 2012. He lost the fight by unanimous decision.

Minowa faced debuting MMA fighter Goran Jettingstad at IGF 1 on April 5, 2014. He won by submission (lateral kneebar).

Minowa then faced Jung-Gyo Park at  ROAD FC 15 on May 31, 2014. Minowa lost the bout via KO late in the first round.

Minowa faced Shinichi Suzukawa at IGF: Inoki Genome Fight 2 on August 23, 2014. He lost the fight via corner stoppage TKO in the second round.

Rizin 
Minowa faced former sumo wrestler Sudario Tsuyoshi at Rizin 26 on December 31, 2020. He lost the fight via first-round technical knockout.

Minowa faced Kiyoshi Kuwabara at Rizin Landmark 4 on November 6, 2022. He lost the fight via ground and pound TKO stoppage in the first round.

Professional wrestling career
In 2010, Minowa turned his attention to professional wrestling. On 22 February 2010, Minowaman made his debut for Antonio Inoki's IGF facing and defeating Necro Butcher in a 10-minute match.

Minowa has also undertook some additional professional wrestling training under the tutelage of Satoru Sayama, the original Tiger Mask. On July 18, 2010, Minowa debuted as the fifth generation Tiger Mask.

On September 5, 2019 it was announced that Minowa would face Timothy Thatcher on Saturday September 14, 2019 as part of Josh Barnett's GCW Bloodsport 2 event.

Education
Minowa attended the Toyama College of Health and Science.

Championships and accomplishments
 DREAM
 2009 DREAM Super Hulk Grand Prix Champion
 Pancrase Hybrid Wrestling
 1999 Neo Blood Tournament Winner
 2000 King of Pancrase Light Heavyweight Championship Tournament Runner-Up
 1997 Neo Blood Tournament Semifinalist
 PRIDE Fighting Championships
 2005 PRIDE Welterweight Grand Prix Semifinalist

Mixed martial arts record

|-
|Loss
|align=center|
|Kiyoshi Kuwabara
|TKO (punches)
|Rizin Landmark 4
|
|align=center|1
|align=center|2:24
|Nagoya, Japan
|
|-
| Loss
| align=center| 64–43–8
| Tsuyoshi Sudario
| TKO (leg injury)
| Rizin 26: Saitama
| 
| align=center| 1
| align=center| 3:17
| Saitama, Japan
|
|-
| Win
| align=center| 64–42–8
| Dong Sik Yoon
| TKO (finger injury)
| ROAD FC 42
| 
| align=center| 2
| align=center| 2:26
| South Korea
|
|-
| Loss
| align=center| 63–42–8
| Yuki Kondo
| Decision (unanimous)
| Pancrase 288
| 
| align=center| 3
| align=center| 3:00
| Tokyo, Japan
|
|-
| Win
| align=center| 63–41–8
| Tetsuo Onuma
| KO
| CMA MMA - Crazy King 8 / CMA Kaiser 4
| 
| align=center| 2
| align=center| 1:31
| Tokyo, Japan
|
|-
| Loss
| align=center| 62–41–8
| Yuya Shirai
| Decision (unanimous)
| DEEP: 75 Impact
| 
| align=center| 3
| align=center| 5:00
| Tokyo, Japan
| 
|-
| Loss
| align=center| 62–40–8
| Zilong Zhao
| TKO (punches)
| ROAD FC 27 in China
| 
| align=center| 1
| align=center| 1:24
| Shanghai, China
| 
|-
| Win
| align=center| 62–39–8
| Tetsuo Kondo
| Submission (choke)
| ACF 14
| 
| align=center| 1
| align=center| 2:48
| Osaka, Japan
| 
|-
| Loss
| align=center| 61–39–8
| Justin Morton
| Decision (unanimous)
| VTJ in Okinawa
| 
| align=center| 3
| align=center| 5:00
| Okinawa, Japan 
| 
|-
| Win
| align=center| 61–38–8
| Dae Sung Kim
| Decision (unanimous)
| Road FC 24
| 
| align=center| 3
| align=center| 5:00
| Koto, Tokyo, Japan
| 
|-
| Loss
| align=center| 60–38–8
| Oli Thompson
| Decision (unanimous)
| Inoki Genome Fight 3
| 
| align=center| 2
| align=center| 5:00
| Tokyo, Japan
| 
|-
| Win
| align=center| 60–37–8
| Yuichiro Ono
| TKO (doctor stoppage)
| Gladiator 81
| 
| align=center| 2
| align=center| N/A
| Tokyo, Japan
| 
|-
| Loss
| align=center| 59–37–8
| Shinichi Suzukawa
| TKO (corner stoppage)
| IGF: Inoki Genome Fight 2
| 
| align=center| 2
| align=center| 0:59
| Tokyo, Japan
| 
|-
| Loss
| align=center| 59–36–8
| Jung-Gyo Park
| KO (punch)
| ROAD FC 15
| 
| align=center| 1
| align=center| 4:42
| Wonju, South Korea
|
|-
| Win
| align=center| 59–35–8
| Goran Jettingstad
| Technical Submission (lateral kneebar)
| Inoki Genome Fight 1
| 
| align=center| 1
| align=center| 2:26
| Tokyo, Japan
| 
|-
| Win
| align=center| 58–35–8
| Atsushi Sawada
| TKO (punch and soccer kick)
| IGF: Inoki-Bom-Ba-Ye 2013
| 
| align=center| 1
| align=center| 3:47
| Tokyo, Japan
| 
|-
| Win
| align=center| 57–35–8
| Hoon Kim
| KO (punch)
| Road FC 13
| 
| align=center| 1
| align=center| 3:37
| Seoul, South Korea
| 
|-
| Loss
| align=center| 56–35–8
| Hae Suk Son
| TKO (punches)
| Road FC 11
| 
| align=center| 3
| align=center| 0:54
| Seoul, South Korea
| 
|-
| Win
| align=center| 56–34–8
| Bor Bratovž
| Submission  (heel hook)
| IGF: Inoki-Bom-Ba-Ye 2012
| 
| align=center| 1
| align=center| 3:20
| Ryogoku Kokugikan, Japan
| 
|-
| Win
| align=center| 55–34–8
| Jin Soo Yuk
| Submission (kimura)
| Road FC 9
| 
| align=center| 1
| align=center| 4:59
| Wonju Chiak Indoor Gym, South Korea
| 
|-
| Loss
| align=center| 54–34–8
| Alexander Shlemenko
| TKO (knees and body punches)
| SFL 2
| 
| align=center| 1
| align=center| 2:20
| Chandigarh, India
| 
|-
| Win
| align=center| 54–33–8
| Shigeki Tsuchiya
| Submission (kimura)
| Gladiator 30
| 
| align=center| 1
| align=center| 1:16
| Fukuoka, Japan
| 
|-
| Win
| align=center| 53–33–8
| Toshihiro Koyama
| Submission (arm-triangle choke)
| Gladiator 29
| 
| align=center| 1
| align=center| 1:49
| Kariya, Aichi, Japan
|
|-
| Loss
| align=center| 52–33–8
| Kendall Grove
| Decision (unanimous)
| ProElite 3
| 
| align=center| 3
| align=center| 5:00
| Honolulu, Hawaii, United States
| 
|-
| Win
| align=center| 52–32–8
| Dev Kumar Ghimire
| Submission (armbar)
| Gladiator 27
| 
| align=center| 1
| align=center| 1:20
| Tokyo, Japan
| 
|-
| Win
| align=center| 51–32–8
| Young Woo Yu
| Submission (kimura)
| Gladiator 25
| 
| align=center| 1
| align=center| 2:55
| Tokyo, Japan
| 
|-
| Win
| align=center| 50–32–8
| Baru Harn
| Submission (scarf-hold armlock)
| DREAM 17
| 
| align=center| 1
| align=center| 4:39
| Saitama, Japan
| 
|-
| Win
| align=center| 49–32–8
| Jair Gomes
| Submission (neck crank)
| Gladiator 22
| 
| align=center| 1
| align=center| N/A
| Gifu, Japan
| 
|-
| Win
| align=center| 48–32–8
| Carlos Toyota
| Decision (unanimous)
| Heat 18
| 
| align=center| 3
| align=center| 5:00
| Osaka, Japan
| 
|-
| Loss
| align=center| 47–32–8
| Hiroshi Izumi
| TKO (punches)
| Dynamite!! 2010
| 
| align=center| 3
| align=center| 2:50
| Saitama, Japan
| 
|-
| Win
| align=center| 47–31–8
| Chang Hee Kim
| Submission (scarf-hold armlock)
| DEEP: 50 Impact
| 
| align=center| 1
| align=center| 2:07
| Tokyo, Japan
| 
|-
| Loss
| align=center| 46–31–8
| Satoshi Ishii
| Decision (unanimous)
| DREAM 16
| 
| align=center| 2
| align=center| 5:00
| Nagoya, Japan
| 
|-
| Win
| align=center| 46–30–8
| Imani Lee
| Submission (rear-naked choke)
| DREAM 14
| 
| align=center| 1
| align=center| 4:16
| Saitama, Saitama, Japan
| 
|-
| Win
| align=center| 45–30–8
| Jimmy Ambriz
| Submission (toe hold)
| DREAM 13
| 
| align=center| 2
| align=center| 2:42
| Yokohama, Japan
| 
|-
| Win
| align=center| 44–30–8
| Rameau Thierry Sokoudjou
| KO (punch)
| Dynamite!! The Power of Courage 2009
| 
| align=center| 3
| align=center| 3:29
| Saitama, Japan
| 
|-
| Win
| align=center| 43–30–8
| Choi Hong-man
| Submission (heel hook)
| DREAM 11
| 
| align=center| 2
| align=center| 1:27
| Yokohama, Japan
| 
|-
| Win
| align=center| 42–30–8
| Bob Sapp
| Submission (achilles lock)
| DREAM 9
| 
| align=center| 1
| align=center| 1:15
| Yokohama, Japan
| 
|-
| Loss
| align=center| 41–30–8
| Katsuyori Shibata
| Decision (unanimous)
| DREAM 8
| 
| align=center| 2
| align=center| 5:00
| Nagoya, Japan
| 
|-
| Win
| align=center| 41–29–8
| Errol Zimmerman
| Submission (toe hold)
| Fields Dynamite!! 2008
| 
| align=center| 1
| align=center| 1:01
| Saitama, Japan
| 
|-
| Loss
| align=center| 40–29–8
| Masakatsu Funaki
| Submission (heel hook)
| DREAM 6: Middleweight Grand Prix 2008 Final Round
| 
| align=center| 1
| align=center| 0:52
| Saitama, Japan
| 
|-
| Win
| align=center| 40–28–8
| Don Frye
| Submission (kneebar)
| DEEP: Gladiator
| 
| align=center| 1
| align=center| 3:56
| Okayama, Japan
|
|-
| Loss
| align=center| 39–28–8
| Taiei Kin
| Decision (unanimous)
| DREAM 2: Middleweight Grand Prix 2008 First Round
| 
| align=center| 2
| align=center| 5:00
| Saitama, Japan
| 
|-
| Win
| align=center| 39–27–8
| Kwan Bum Lee
| Submission (kneebar)
| DREAM 1: Lightweight Grand Prix 2008 First Round
| 
| align=center| 1
| align=center| 1:25
| Saitama, Japan
| 
|-
| Loss
| align=center| 38–27–8
| Zuluzinho
| TKO (corner stoppage)
| K-1 Premium 2007 Dynamite!!
| 
| align=center| 3
| align=center| 2:13
| Saitama, Japan
|
|-
| Loss
| align=center| 38–26–8
| Kim Min-Soo
| TKO (punches)
| HERO'S 2007 in Korea
| 
| align=center| 1
| align=center| 3:46
| Seoul, South Korea
| 
|-
| Win
| align=center| 38–25–8
| Kevin Casey
| TKO (punches)
| HERO'S 10
| 
| align=center| 2
| align=center| 0:42
| Yokohama, Japan
| 
|-
| Win
| align=center| 37–25–8
| Seung Hyun Choi
| Submission (hammerlock)
| Heat 4
| 
| align=center| 1
| align=center| 1:41
| Nagoya, Japan
| 
|-
| Win
| align=center| 36–25–8
| Min Suk Heo
| TKO (corner stoppage)
| DEEP: CMA Festival 2
| 
| align=center| 1
| align=center| 5:00
| Tokyo, Japan
| 
|-
| Loss
| align=center| 35–25–8
| Kiyoshi Tamura
| KO (soccer kicks)
| PRIDE FC: Shockwave 2006
| 
| align=center| 1
| align=center| 1:18
| Saitama, Japan
| 
|-
| Win
| align=center| 35–24–8
| Mike Plotcheck
| Decision (unanimous)
| PRIDE: Bushido 13
| 
| align=center| 2
| align=center| 5:00
| Yokohama, Japan
| 
|-
| Win
| align=center| 34–24–8
| Butterbean
| Submission (armbar)
| PRIDE: Bushido 12
| 
| align=center| 1
| align=center| 4:25
| Nagoya, Japan
| 
|-
| Win
| align=center| 33–24–8
| Hyun Gab Park
| Submission (heel hook)
| DEEP: CMA Festival
| 
| align=center| 1
| align=center| 0:17
| Tokyo, Japan
| 
|-
| Loss
| align=center| 32–24–8
| Mirko Cro Cop
| TKO (punches)
| PRIDE FC: Total Elimination Absolute
| 
| align=center| 1
| align=center| 1:10
| Osaka, Japan
| 
|-
| Win
| align=center| 32–23–8
| Giant Silva
| TKO (knees)
| PRIDE: Bushido 10
| 
| align=center| 1
| align=center| 2:23
| Tokyo, Japan
| 
|-
| Win
| align=center| 31–23–8
| Dave Legeno
| Submission (achilles lock)
| Cage Rage 15
| 
| align=center| 1
| align=center| 2:21
| London, England
| 
|-
| Loss
| align=center| 30–23–8
| Kazushi Sakuraba
| Technical Submission (kimura)
| PRIDE Shockwave 2005
| 
| align=center| 1
| align=center| 9:59
| Saitama, Japan
| 
|-
| Loss
| align=center| 30–22–8
| Murilo Bustamante
| TKO (punches)
| rowspan=2|PRIDE Bushido 9
| rowspan=2|
| align=center| 1
| align=center| 9:51
| rowspan=2|Tokyo, Japan
| 
|-
| Win
| align=center| 30–21–8
| Phil Baroni
| Decision (unanimous)
| align=center| 2
| align=center| 5:00
| 
|-
| Win
| align=center| 29–21–8
| Kimo Leopoldo
| Submission (achilles lock)
| PRIDE Bushido 8
| 
| align=center| 1
| align=center| 3:11
| Nagoya, Japan
| 
|-
| Loss
| align=center| 28–21–8
| Phil Baroni
| TKO (stomps)
| PRIDE Bushido 7
| 
| align=center| 2
| align=center| 2:04
| Tokyo, Japan
|
|-
| Win
| align=center| 28–20–8
| Gilbert Yvel
| Submission (toe hold)
| PRIDE Bushido 6
| 
| align=center| 1
| align=center| 1:10
| Yokohama, Japan
| 
|-
| Win
| align=center| 27–20–8
| Stefan Leko
| Submission (heel hook)
| PRIDE Shockwave 2004
| 
| align=center| 1
| align=center| 0:27
| Saitama, Japan
| 
|-
| Win
| align=center| 26–20–8
| Ryuki Ueyama
| Decision (split)
| PRIDE Bushido 5
| 
| align=center| 2
| align=center| 5:00
| Osaka, Japan
| 
|-
| Win
| align=center| 25–20–8
| Kenichi Yamamoto
| TKO (punches)
| PRIDE Bushido 4
| 
| align=center| 1
| align=center| 3:23
| Nagoya, Japan
| 
|-
| Win
| align=center| 24–20–8
| Eduard Churakov
| Submission (rear-naked choke)
| Gladiator FC: Day 1
| 
| align=center| 1
| align=center| 2:29
| South Korea
| 
|-
| Loss
| align=center| 23–20–8
| Ryan Gracie
| Decision (split)
| PRIDE Bushido 3
| 
| align=center| 2
| align=center| 5:00
| Yokohama, Japan
|
|-
| Loss
| align=center| 23–19–8
| Wanderlei Silva
| TKO (punches)
| PRIDE Bushido 2
| 
| align=center| 1
| align=center| 1:09
| Yokohama, Japan
| 
|-
| Loss
| align=center| 23–18–8
| Quinton Jackson
| TKO (knee)
| PRIDE Shockwave 2003
| 
| align=center| 2
| align=center| 1:05
| Saitama, Japan
| 
|-
| Win
| align=center| 23–17–8
| Silmar Rodrigo
| Submission (kneebar)
| Brazil Super Fight
| 
| align=center| 2
| align=center| 3:00
| Porto Alegre, Brazil
| 
|-
| Loss
| align=center| 22–17–8
| Ricardo Almeida
| Decision (unanimous)
| Pancrase: Hybrid 2
| 
| align=center| 3
| align=center| 5:00
| Osaka, Japan
| 
|-
| Win
| align=center| 22–16–8
| Yuki Sasaki
| Decision (majority)
| Pancrase: Spirit 8
| 
| align=center| 3
| align=center| 5:00
| Yokohama, Japan
| 
|-
| Loss
| align=center| 21–16–8
| Kiyoshi Tamura
| Decision (unanimous)
| DEEP: 6th Impact
| 
| align=center| 3
| align=center| 5:00
| Tokyo, Japan
| 
|-
| Loss
| align=center| 21–15–8
| Mitsuyoshi Sato
| Decision (majority)
| Pancrase: Spirit 5
| 
| align=center| 3
| align=center| 5:00
| Tokyo, Japan
| 
|-
| Draw
| align=center| 21–14–8
| Yoshinori Momose
| Draw (majority) 
| Pancrase: Spirit 3
| 
| align=center| 2
| align=center| 5:00
| Tokyo, Japan
| 
|-
| Win
| align=center| 21–14–7
| Kazuki Okubo
| Submission (armbar)
| DEEP: 3rd Impact
| 
| align=center| 1
| align=center| 3:38
| Tokyo, Japan
| 
|-
| Win
| align=center| 20–14–7
| Hiroshi Shibata
| TKO (doctor stoppage)
| Pancrase: Proof 7
| 
| align=center| 1
| align=center| 2:28
| Yokohama, Japan
| 
|-
| Loss
| align=center| 19–14–7
| Sanae Kikuta
| TKO (doctor stoppage)
| Pancrase: 2001 Anniversary Show
| 
| align=center| 2
| align=center| 4:30
| Yokohama, Japan
| 
|-
| Win
| align=center| 19–13–7
| Kenji Akiyama
| Submission (guillotine choke)
| Pancrase: 2001 Neo-Blood Tournament Opening Round
| 
| align=center| 3
| align=center| 2:52
| Tokyo, Japan
| 
|-
| Win
| align=center| 18–13–7
| Yuki Sasaki
| Submission (toe hold)
| Pancrase: Proof 3
| 
| align=center| 3
| align=center| 0:25
| Tokyo, Japan
| 
|-
| Loss
| align=center| 17–13–7
| Paulo Filho
| Decision (unanimous)
| Pancrase: Proof 2
| 
| align=center| 3
| align=center| 5:00
| Osaka, Japan
| 
|-
| Draw
| align=center| 17–12–7
| Ricardo Liborio
| Draw
| DEEP: 1st Impact
| 
| align=center| 3
| align=center| 5:00
| Nagoya, Japan
| 
|-
| Win
| align=center| 17–12–6
| Magomed Ismailov
| Submission (armbar)
| Pancrase: Trans 7
| 
| align=center| 1
| align=center| 1:31
| Tokyo, Japan
| 
|-
| Loss
| align=center| 16–12–6
| Keiichiro Yamamiya
| Decision (unanimous)
| rowspan=2|Pancrase: 2000 Anniversary Show
| rowspan=2|
| align=center| 2
| align=center| 3:00
| rowspan=2|Yokohama, Japan
| 
|-
| Win
| align=center| 16–11–6
| Brian Gassaway
| Submission (toe hold)
| align=center| 1
| align=center| 5:00
| 
|-
| Win
| align=center| 15–11–6
| Tony Ross
| Submission (armbar)
| rowspan=2|Pancrase: Trans 5
| rowspan=2|
| align=center| 1
| align=center| 1:32
| rowspan=2|Tokyo, Japan
| 
|-
| Win
| align=center| 14–11–6
| Masaya Kojima
| Submission (toe hold)
| align=center| 1
| align=center| 1:43
| 
|-
| Win
| align=center| 13–11–6
| Joe Slick
| TKO (doctor stoppage)
| UFC 25
| 
| align=center| 3
| align=center| 2:02
| Tokyo, Japan
| 
|-
| Win
| align=center| 12–11–6
| Ichio Matsubara
| Submission (rear-naked choke)
| Pancrase: Trans 2
| 
| align=center| 1
| align=center| 1:21
| Osaka, Japan
| 
|-
| Draw
| align=center| 11–11–6
| Chris Lytle
| Draw
| Pancrase: Breakthrough 11
| 
| align=center| 1
| align=center| 15:00
| Yokohama, Japan
| 
|-
| Win
| align=center| 11–11–5
| Adrian Serrano
| Submission (heel hook)
| Pancrase: Breakthrough 9
| 
| align=center| 1
| align=center| 11:38
| Tokyo, Japan
| 
|-
| Loss
| align=center| 10–11–5
| Semmy Schilt
| Decision (unanimous)
| Pancrase: 1999 Anniversary Show
| 
| align=center| 1
| align=center| 10:00
| Chiba, Japan
| 
|-
| Win
| align=center| 10–10–5
| Minoru Toyonaga
| Submission (rear-naked choke)
| rowspan=3|Pancrase: 1999 Neo-Blood Tournament Second Round
| rowspan=3|
| align=center| 1
| align=center| 2:57
| rowspan=3|Tokyo, Japan
| 
|-
| Win
| align=center| 9–10–5
| Daisuke Watanabe
| Submission (triangle choke)
| align=center| 1
| align=center| 4:28
| 
|-
| Win
| align=center| 8–10–5
| Daiju Takase
| Submission (triangle choke)
| align=center| 1
| align=center| 7:59
| 
|-
| Loss
| align=center| 7–10–5
| Jason DeLucia
| Decision (unanimous)
| Pancrase: Breakthrough 6
| 
| align=center| 1
| align=center| 10:00
| Tokyo, Japan
| 
|-
| Draw
| align=center| 7–9–5
| Osami Shibuya
| Draw
| Pancrase: Breakthrough 5
| 
| align=center| 2
| align=center| 3:00
| Nagoya, Japan
| 
|-
| Draw
| align=center| 7–9–4
| Susumu Yamasaki
| Draw
| Daidojuku: Wars 5
| 
| align=center| 1
| align=center| 15:00
| Japan
| 
|-
| Win
| align=center| 7–9–3
| Kosei Kubota
| Decision (unanimous)
| Pancrase: Breakthrough 3
| 
| align=center| 1
| align=center| 10:00
| Tokyo, Japan
| 
|-
| Win
| align=center| 6–9–3
| Daisuke Ishii
| Decision (majority)
| Pancrase: Breakthrough 2
| 
| align=center| 1
| align=center| 10:00
| Osaka, Japan
| 
|-
| Win
| align=center| 5–9–3
| Daisuke Watanabe
| Submission (armbar)
| Pancrase: Breakthrough 1
| 
| align=center| 1
| align=center| 3:18
| Tokyo, Japan
| 
|-
| Win
| align=center| 4–9–3
| Satoshi Hasegawa
| Submission (armbar)
| Pancrase: Advance 11
| 
| align=center| 1
| align=center| 2:43
| Osaka, Japan
| 
|-
| Win
| align=center| 3–9–3
| Daisuke Ishii
| Decision (unanimous)
| Pancrase: Advance 10
| 
| align=center| 1
| align=center| 10:00
| Tokyo, Japan
| 
|-
| Draw
| align=center| 2–9–3
| Travis Fulton
| Draw (unanimous) 
| Pancrase: Advance 9
| 
| align=center| 2
| align=center| 3:00
| Tokyo, Japan
| 
|-
| Loss
| align=center| 2–9–2
| Evan Tanner
| Submission (arm-triangle choke)
| Pancrase: 1998 Neo-Blood Tournament Opening Round
| 
| align=center| 1
| align=center| 4:05
| Tokyo, Japan
| 
|-
| Draw
| align=center| 2–8–2
| Kosei Kubota
| Draw (split) 
| Pancrase: Advance 8
| 
| align=center| 2
| align=center| 3:00
| Kobe, Japan
| 
|-
| Win
| align=center| 2–8–1
| Adrian Serrano
| Decision (lost points)
| Pancrase: Advance 7
| 
| align=center| 1
| align=center| 10:00
| Tokyo, Japan
| 
|-
| Loss
| align=center| 1–8–1
| Satoshi Hasegawa
| Decision (majority)
| Pancrase: Advance 5
| 
| align=center| 2
| align=center| 3:00
| Yokohama, Japan
| 
|-
| Loss
| align=center| 1–7–1
| Satoshi Hasegawa
| Submission (toe hold)
| Pancrase: Advance 1
| 
| align=center| 2
| align=center| 1:10
| Tokyo, Japan
| 
|-
| Loss
| align=center| 1–6–1
| Jason DeLucia
| Submission (rear-naked choke)
| Pancrase: Alive 11
| 
| align=center| 1
| align=center| 3:47
| Yokohama, Japan
| 
|-
| Loss
| align=center| 1–5–1
| Osami Shibuya
| Decision (lost points)
| Pancrase: Alive 10
| 
| align=center| 1
| align=center| 10:00
| Kobe, Japan
| 
|-
| Loss
| align=center| 1–4–1
| Takafumi Ito
| Submission (toe hold)
| Pancrase: Alive 9
| 
| align=center| 1
| align=center| 6:34
| Tokyo, Japan
| 
|-
| Draw
| align=center| 1–3–1
| Kosei Kubota
| Draw (majority) 
| Pancrase: 1997 Anniversary Show
| 
| align=center| 1
| align=center| 10:00
| Chiba, Japan
| 
|-
| Loss
| align=center| 1–3
| Yuki Kondo
| Submission (toe hold)
| Pancrase: Alive 8
| 
| align=center| 1
| align=center| 5:13
| Osaka, Japan
| 
|-
| Loss
| align=center| 1–2
| Satoshi Hasegawa
| Decision (unanimous)
| Pancrase: 1997 Neo-Blood Tournament, Round 2
| 
| align=center| 2
| align=center| 3:00
| Tokyo, Japan
| 
|-
| Win
| align=center| 1–1
| Haygar Chin
| Submission (kneebar)
| Pancrase: 1997 Neo-Blood Tournament, Round 1
| 
| align=center| 1
| align=center| 2:24
| Tokyo, Japan
| 
|-
| Loss
| align=center| 0–1
| Yuzo Tateishi
| Decision 
| Lumax Cup: Tournament of J '96
| 
| align=center| 2
| align=center| 3:00
| Japan
|

Submission grappling record

|- style="text-align:center; background:#f0f0f0;"
| style="border-style:none none solid solid; "|Result
| style="border-style:none none solid solid; "|Opponent
| style="border-style:none none solid solid; "|Method
| style="border-style:none none solid solid; "|Event
| style="border-style:none none solid solid; "|Date
| style="border-style:none none solid solid; "|Round
| style="border-style:none none solid solid; "|Time
| style="border-style:none none solid solid; "|Notes
|-
|Win|| Hideo Tokoro || Submission (ankle hold) || Quintet Fight Night 4 || November 30, 2019 || 1 || N/A ||
|-
|Loss|| Shutaro Debana || Submission (flying armbar) || Quintet Fight Night 2 || February 3, 2019 || 1 || 0:12 ||
|-
|Loss|| AJ Agazarm || Submission (triangle choke) || Polaris 4 || October 29, 2016 || 1 || 5:11 ||
|-

See also
List of professional wrestlers by MMA record

References

External links
 Official website (Japanese)
 
 
 PRIDE profile

1976 births
Living people
Japanese male mixed martial artists
Middleweight mixed martial artists
Light heavyweight mixed martial artists
Mixed martial artists utilizing judo
Mixed martial artists utilizing catch wrestling
Japanese catch wrestlers
Japanese male professional wrestlers
Japanese male judoka
Sportspeople from Gifu Prefecture
Sasuke (TV series) contestants
Ultimate Fighting Championship male fighters